Carl Haakon Waadeland (born 8 November 1952) is a Norwegian musicologist and jazz drummer, known from several bands and releases such as with Dadafon, Dum Dum Boys, Åge & Sambandet, Halvdan Sivertsen, Warne Marsh, Kenny Wheeler, Annbjørg Lien, Henning Sommerro, Bjørn Alterhaug, John Pål Inderberg, Knutsen & Ludvigsen, Mikis Theodorakis and Arja Saijonmaa. He was one of the driving forces behind the jazz program at NTNU which he also directed.

Career 
Waadeland holds a master's degree in mathematics and PhD in music theory from the NTNU, where he concentrates on rhythm, swing, music performance (performologi), rhythm and movement, as a professor of Music. In his PhD thesis he developed simulation models of rhythm abnormalities (2000). Waadeland has performed and released several albums with jazz bands such as Bodega Band, Siri's Svale Band, and Dadafon (1995–2002).

He otherwise has contributed a number of releases by Mid-Norwegian artists Knutsen & Ludvigsen, Gary Holton & Casino Steel (1982), Hans Rotmo, Terje Tysland, Halvdan Sivertsen, Hilde Heltberg, Åge Aleksandersen, Øystein Dolmen, Dum Dum Boys and Henning Sommerro.

He performed repeatedly at Moldejazz Festival, Kongsberg Jazz Festival, Nattjazz in Bergen, Festival of North Norway, Trondheim Jazz Festival, St. Olav Festival in Trondheim, and Trøndelag Theatre and Concert scenes.

Selected publications 
Waadeland, C. H. (2011). Rhythm performance from a spectral point of view. In A. R. Jensenius, A. Tveit, R. I. Godøy & D. Overholt (Eds.), Proceedings of the International Conference on New Interfaces for Musical Expression (pp. 248–251). University of Oslo.
Waadeland, C.H (2006). The influence of tempo on movement and timing in rhythm performance. In: Proceedings of 9th international conference on music perception and cognition. Bologna University Press, 2006, pp. 45–46.
Waadeland, C.H (2006). Strategies in empirical studies of swing groove. Studia Musicologica Norvegica (32) pp. 169–191.
Waadeland, C.H. (2003). Analysis of Jazz Drummers' Movements in Performance of Swing Grooves – A Preliminary Report. Proceedings of the Stockholm Music Acoustics Conference, 6–9 August 2003 (SMAC 03), Volume II (573–576). KTH, Stockholm. . Journal of New Music Research 30(1), 23–37.
Waadeland, C.H. (2001). "It Don't Mean a Thing If It Ain't Got That Swing" – Simulating Expressive Timing by Modulated Movements. Journal of New Music Research 30(1), pp. 23–37.
Waadeland, C.H. (1991). Trommeslåtter- en trommeslagers skattekiste (bok+kassett). Trondheim: TIMA Forlag. New release 2008: Norsk Musikforlag A/S: Bok+CD.
Danielsen, A, Waadeland, C.H, Sundt, H.G. (2008). Identifying Timing by Sound: Timbral Qualities of Micro-Rhythm. In: Proceedings of the 10th International Conference on Music Perception and Cognition. ICMPC10, Sapporo, Japan, 2008, . s. 74
Petrini, Karin; Pollick, Frank E; Dahl, S; McAleer, P; McKay, L; Rocchesso, Davide; Waadeland, Carl Haakon; Love, Scott; Avanzini, Federico; Puce, Aina (2011). Action expertise reduces brain activity for audiovisual matching actions: An fMRI study with expert drummers. NeuroImage Volum 56.(3) s. 1480–1492

Discography

As Carl Haakon 
Solo projects
2008: Din Råta Tjuv (Heilo), nominated for the Norwegian Folk Music Awards 2008, in several classes

As Karl Håkon 
Within Søyr
1977: Søyr (MAI 7705)

With DumDum Boys
1988: Blodig Alvor Na Na Na Na Na (CBS)

As Carlos 
With TNT
1988: Tell No Tales (Vertigo)

With Gary Holton & Casino Steel
1983: III Edition (Polydor)
1984: No 4 (Polydor)

References 

1952 births
20th-century drummers
20th-century Norwegian drummers
21st-century Norwegian drummers
Heilo Music artists
Living people
Musicians from Trondheim
Academic staff of the Norwegian University of Science and Technology
Norwegian jazz drummers
Male drummers
Norwegian rock drummers
Norwegian University of Science and Technology alumni
20th-century Norwegian male musicians
21st-century Norwegian male musicians
Male jazz musicians
Siri's Svale Band members
Bodega Band members